Algerian Handball Federation (FAHB) is the national handball and beach handball federation in Algeria. FAHB organizes handball within Algeria, and represents Algerian handball internationally. The federation is a member of the African Handball Confederation (CAHB), Algerian Olympic Committee and the International Handball Federation (IHF). The current president of the FAHB is Said Bouamra.

Presidents

Competitions

Men Senior Competitions
Algerian Handball Championship (Division 1)
Algerian Handball Championship D2 (Division 2)
Algerian Handball Cup

Women Senior Competitions
Algerian Women's Handball Championship
Algerian Women's Handball Cup

External links
Tout le handball algérien - dzhand.net

African Handball Confederation
Handball
Handball in Algeria
Sports organizations established in 1962